St Andrew's Church, Wolverhampton is a parish church in the Church of England in Wolverhampton

History

The foundation stone of St Andrew's was laid by Revd. J.H. Iles on 25 May 1865 and building started to the designs of local architect Edward Banks. It was to have enough room for 311 persons. The church was extended in 1870 with space for 700 seats and consecrated on 2 November 1870.

The church was added to in 1891 and 1892 by F.T. Beck. On 31 May 1964 it was destroyed by fire. Only two stained glass windows were unharmed in the fire.

The new church was designed by Richard Twentyman and construction started in 1965 and the church was opened in 1967. The west window was designed by John Piper and created by Patrick Reyntiens. The church cost £48,000 (equivalent to £ in ). Pevsner described the building as Blocky, of brick, and convincing.

References

Church of England church buildings in the West Midlands (county)
Rebuilt churches in the United Kingdom
Churches completed in 1967
20th-century Church of England church buildings
Richard Twentyman